India competed at the 2013 World Games in Cali, Colombia, from 25 July to 4 August 2013. A total of 10 athletes competed. India won one gold medal, its first ever, in Snooker.) The country also won one silver medal in invitational sports (Wushu).

Medalists

Athletes

References

Nations at the 2013 World Games
2013
2013 in Indian sport